Glossop North End Association Football Club is a football club in Glossop, Derbyshire, England, which compete in the . Their home ground is Surrey Street, which has a capacity of 1,301 (200 seated, 1,101 standing). The club play in blue, and are nicknamed the Hillmen or the Peakites. Between 1899 and 1992 the club was officially known simply as Glossop. Glossop is one of the smallest towns in England to have had a Football League club, and it remains the smallest town whose team has played in the English top-flight.

The club was founded in February 1886 and joined the North Cheshire League four years later. Glossop spent two seasons each in The Combination and the Midland League, before moving to North Road and being elected into the Football League Second Division in 1898. Having been promoted in the 1898–99 season, they spent one season in the First Division. During this period the club was bankrolled by Sir Samuel Hill-Wood, who was later to become chairman of Arsenal.  The club retains some connections with Arsenal. Glossop were relegated in 1900 and spent the next fifteen seasons in the Second Division, before exiting the Football League during World War I.

Glossop North End spent 1920 to 1957 in the Manchester League, being crowned champions in 1927–28. They moved from the Lancashire Combination back to the Manchester League in 1966, and then spent four seasons in the Cheshire County League from 1978. Glossop were founder members of the North West Counties League in 1982 and won Premier Division title at the end of the 2014–15 campaign. They were beaten finalists in the FA Vase in 2009 and 2015.

History

Early years

Glossop North End were founded in 1886, when they played friendly amateur matches. They played at various grounds in the town, including Pyegrove, Silk Street, Water Lane and Cemetery Road before settling at North Road.
The club joined the North Cheshire League in 1890, before moving to the Combination in 1894 and turning professional. In their first season in the Combination, 1894–95, they finished as runners-up. After ending the following season, 1895–96, in third, the club moved to the Midland League and in the 1896–97 season finished as runners-up. After a second season in the Midland League, they were elected to the Second Division of the Football League in 1898–99 finishing as runners-up to Manchester City and winning promotion to the First Division. They then changed their name to Glossop (primarily to avoid any confusion with Preston North End) before spending their one and only season in the top flight, 1899–1900 when they finished in last place and were relegated back to the Second Division, having won only 4 matches, all at home, against Burnley, Nottingham Forest, Blackburn and Aston Villa.

They then spent the next fifteen seasons in the Second Division, during which time they reached the quarter-finals of the FA Cup in 1908–09 where they lost to 1–0 to eventual finalists Bristol City in a replay on 10 March 1909. The club's chairman and benefactor at the time was Sir Samuel Hill-Wood, who was later to become chairman of Arsenal. However, the club became perennial strugglers in the Second Division.

The 1913–14 season saw a club record attendance of 10,736 for an FA Cup second round match against Preston North End on 31 January 1914. However, the following season they finished bottom of the league and had to apply for re-election. This was curtailed when the start of World War I meant the Football League closed down. Glossop were then re-formed toward the end of the war by Oswald Partington, but failed to be re-elected back into the Football League. Glossop then joined the Lancashire Combination, playing just one season, 1919–20. Northern Nomads ground-shared with Glossop for several years during this time. The club then dropped out of the Lancashire Combination and into the Manchester League. In the 1920s and 1930s they won the Gilcryst Cup three times and were crowned Manchester League champions in 1927–28. They won the Gilcryst Cup for a fourth time in 1947–48.

1950s onwards
During 1955, the club moved from its original home of North Road to their current ground Surrey Street, with the first game played at their new home on 17 September 1955. In 1957 Glossop rejoined the Lancashire Combination, finishing in eighth in 1957–58. They spent nine seasons in the league before dropping back down once more to the Manchester League after the 1965–66 season. They joined the Cheshire County League as founder members of Division Two in the 1978–79 season, finishing in 17th. In 1980–81 they were Division Two runners-up, only losing out on the title on goal difference, but still winning promotion to Division One. After a sixth-place finish in 1981–82, the club became founder members of the newly formed North West Counties Football League in 1982 when the Cheshire County League merged with the Lancashire Combination. In 1986, the club marked their centenary season with a match with sister club Arsenal. They joined Division One, however they struggled in the league for the next six seasons and after finishing bottom in 1987–88 were relegated to Division Two. The 1990–91 season saw the club reach the fourth round of the FA Vase where they lost to Cammell Laird 2–1 in a replay. They also won the North West Counties Football League Division Two Cup, beating Cheadle Town 2–1 in the final. However, the club almost folded in 1990–91 when their then Chairman sold the ground to the local council and left the club with large debts. The present Board of Directors took over in January 1991. After a sixth-place finish in 1991–92 they were promoted back to Division One over higher-placed clubs and after the season the directors reverted the club's name to Glossop North End.

In their first season under the club's original name, they reached the semi-finals of the North West Counties League Cup, before losing to Nantwich Town 5–2 over two legs. They reached the semi-finals of the League's floodlit Cup in 1994–95, losing to Penrith 3–1 over two legs. In the 1996–97 season they beat Trafford in the final of the Manchester Premier Cup at Old Trafford, before winning the competition again the following season, this time beating Radcliffe Borough in the final at Maine Road. They also reached the semi-finals of the North West Counties League Cup, losing to Vauxhall Motors 3–1 over two legs.

2000s onwards
In the 2000–01 season they won the Derbyshire County Football Association Senior Challenge Cup beating Glapwell in a two-legged final, drawing 3–3 away and 2–2 at home before winning 4–2 on penalties. In the league the club struggled to avoid relegation from Division One throughout much of the early 2000s, before finishing ninth in 2006–07, the highest position attained by manager Chris Nicholson in his six seasons at the club. Nicholson announced in March 2007 that he was to step down at the end of the season. As a result, his assistant Steve Young was eventually appointed manager for 2007–08.  In the 2008–09 season they reached the final of the FA Vase where they lost 2–0 to Northern League First Division side Whitley Bay at Wembley Stadium, on 10 May 2009.
Due to this achievement, Arsenal, with whom they retain connections due to Arsenal chairman Peter Hill-Wood's grandfather Sir Samuel Hill-Wood having owned and bankrolled Glossop during their run in the Football League, invited them to their state-of-the-art London Colney training ground during their stay in London, to prepare for the FA Vase final.

In May 2013 the club appointed Chris Wilcock as first team manager.  In his first season the team finished third in the North West Counties League. During the season Glossop produced an unbeaten run in the league of 22 games, with only 5 draws, stretching from November 2013 until they were beaten by Bootle in April 2014.

On 19 April 2015 Glossop beat Nelson to win the North West Counties League Premier Division, earning promotion to Division One North of the Northern Premier League. They also reached two cup finals; the North West Counties League Cup, where they faced Atherton Collieries winning 2–0, and the FA Vase final, in which they played North Shields at Wembley Stadium. In a repeat of the 2009 final, Glossop were beaten 2–1 after extra time.

Glossop began the 2015–16 season in the Northern Premier League Division One North. They also competed in the FA Trophy for the first time since 1986. The club finished fourth and qualified for the playoffs but lost 2–1 to Northwich Victoria in the semi final. At the end of the 2016–17 season Chris Wilcock resigned as manager, leaving the position after 4 seasons and as the winningest manager in recorded history. On 19 May 2017 the club announced that the joint team of Steve Halford and Paul Phillips would take the reins at Surrey Street  On 12 March 2018 the management team left Glossop to join Buxton. Goalkeeper coach Mark Canning took over as caretaker manager, assisted by Andy Bishop. This was made a permanent position at the end of the 2017–18 season. However, after a poor run of results, culminating in a loss to Widnes in mid October, Canning and Bishop were sacked. After a short search the board appointed ex-Mossley duo Peter Band and Lloyd Morrison as joint managers on 14 October 2018.

In an unprecedented move the majority of football activities were ceased mid March 2020 due to the coronavirus, and by the end of March the NPL took the decision along with all step 4 and lower divisions  to end the season early and expunge all results with no promotion or relegation taking place.  The coronavirus took centre stage again in the 20/21 season, with only a handful of games being played before the season was cancelled in Feb 2021.  This was followed in March 2021 by the resignation of manager Pete Band who left to join up with his hometown team Macclesfield FC.  The new manager, Stuart Mellish, took charge at the beginning of May ready to start the 2021–22 season in the newly realigned NPL Division One West Division.

Historical kits
 0000–0000 years used
 0000–0000 football season used

Grounds

Glossop played at a variety of grounds, including Pyegrove, Silk Street, Water Lane and Cemetery Road before settling at North Road. The ground was originally used for cricket, but became home to Glossop North End in 1898 when the club were elected to the Second Division of the Football League. The football ground was located in the south-east corner of the site, with a seated stand was constructed on the northern side of the pitch and raised earth embankment on a triangular space in the south-east corner and eastern sides. During the football season a temporary wooden seated stand was erected behind the western goal, but removed for the cricket season. The first League match played at North Road was on 3 September 1898, with Glossop defeating Blackburn Rovers 4–1 in front of 4,000 spectators. The last Football League match at North Road was played on 17 April 1915, with just 500 spectators watching a 1–1 draw with Stockport County.

During 1955, the club moved from its original home to the club's home ground Surrey Street. The first game was played on Saturday 17th September 1955 against Radcliffe Borough FC.

Floodlights were installed in 1992.

During the off-season of 2010 the Supporters' Club funded and helped build the new team benches, replacing the aged and basic ones with new spacious dugouts. In the summer of 2011 the club upgraded more of the facilities at Surrey Street. The new clubhouse, dressing rooms, refreshment bar and hospitality room were completed in a relatively short amount of time being ready for the first pre-season game of 2011–12. By March 2012 the ground had achieved the FA Ground Grading grade of E which is required for football clubs to participate at step 4 of the National League System.

During the off season of 2014 season Glossop were approved a grant from the Football Foundation to replace the aged pitch perimeter fence with a new sports rail with mesh panel infill. With that and a few other improvements they achieved the FA Ground Grade of D which was required to remain at step 4 of the National League System. In the summer of 2018 new floodlights were installed.

Attendances
 Largest home attendance: 10,736 vs Preston North End, FA Cup 31 January 1914.

Average league attendances:

Players

Current squad
As of 9 January 2023

Notable former players
Players who have international playing experience or top division experience who have played for Glossop include:

  Thomas Bartley 1897–1899
  Thomas Clifford 1898–1899
  John Goodall 1900–1903
  George Badenoch 1901–1903
  Bob Jack 1902–1903
  Edwin Bardsley 1903
  Fred Spiksley 1904–?
  Archie Goodall 1904–1905
  Thomas Callaghan 1905–1907
  David Copeland 1907–?
  John Robertson 1907–1909
  Leslie Hofton 1908–1910
  Thomas Fitchie 1909–1911
  Billy Herbert 1910–1911
  Harry Bamford 1912-1914
  Alec Campbell 1909–1914
  James Montgomery 1915
  Albert John 'Jack' Allen 1914–1915
  Billy Fitchford 1923–?
  Joe Frail
  Bert Maddlethwaite
  Irvine Thornley
  Frank Booth
  Lee Martin 1998–1999
  Ben Chapman 2016
  Zephaniah Thomas 2017

Ladies' team
The club have a ladies team, Glossop North End Ladies, which was established in 1998. In 2014–15 the team reached the final of the Derbyshire Girls & Ladies League Challenge Cup, losing 2–1 to Mackworth St Francis.

The following season saw them the Challenge Cup, defeating Castle Donnington Ladies 4–1. On 11 May they won the Derbyshire Girls & Ladies League Division One title. They retained the league title the following season, after which they transferred to Division One of the Cheshire WFL.

Honours
Derbyshire Girls & Ladies League
 Division One: 2015–16, 2016–17
Derbyshire Ladies Challenge Cup
 Winners: 2015–16

Youth teams
Glossop North End AFC Juniors was established in 1989. They have teams of both boys in age groups from 6 years old right to Under-21, and girls in age groups from Under-9 to Under-16.  They were accredited to the FA Charter standard Award in 2004, and in 2015 were awarded Derbyshire FA Charter Standard Community club of the year.

Club management

Coaching positions

Managerial history
Based on win % in all competitive matches

Italic - denotes Caretaker Manager
 Stats correct as of 18 September 2022

Honours and achievements

Football League Second Division (2nd tier)
 2nd place promotion: 1898–99
North West Counties League Premier Division (9th tier)
 Champions: 2014–15
Manchester League
 Champions: 1927–28

North West Counties League League Challenge Cup
 Winners: 2014–15
North West Counties League Division Two Cup
 Winners: 1990–91Gilcryst Cup Winners: 1922–23, 1929–30, 1934–35, 1948–49Manchester FA Premier Cup Winners: 1996–97, 1997–98Derbyshire County FA Senior Challenge Cup Winners: 2000–01; runners-up: 2013–14FA Vase Runners-up: 2008–09, 2014–15Manchester FA Fair play Award'''
 Winners: 2014–15

References

External links

 Glossop North End website
 Glossop North End Juniors website
 
 
 Glossop results and players in the English National Football Archive

 
1886 establishments in England
Association football clubs established in 1886
Football clubs in Derbyshire
Football clubs in England
Midland Football League (1889)
Former English Football League clubs
Lancashire Combination
Cheshire County League clubs
North West Counties Football League clubs
Northern Premier League clubs